The Fortunes of Captain Blood is a 1936 British historical adventure novel by the Anglo-Italian writer Rafael Sabatini. It is the third in Sabatini's trilogy alongside Captain Blood (1922) and Captain Blood Returns (1931).

Film adaptation
The novel provided a loose inspiration for the 1950 film Fortunes of Captain Blood made by Columbia Pictures and starring Louis Hayward and Patricia Medina.

References

Bibliography
 Goble, Alan. The Complete Index to Literary Sources in Film. Walter de Gruyter, 1999.

1936 British novels
British historical novels
British adventure novels
Novels set in the 17th century
Novels by Rafael Sabatini
British novels adapted into films